Daniel Suidani is a Solomon Islands politician who served as the Premier of Malaita Province from June 2019 until his ouster in a no confidence vote in February 2023.

Tenure 
During Suidani's tenure as Premier of Malaita Province, the Solomon Islands government officially switched diplomatic recognition from the Republic of China (Taiwan) to the People's Republic of China. Suidani was highly critical of this decision, alleging that the Chinese government offered bribes to him in exchange for political allegiance. Suidani has in turn been accused of accepting bribes from the Taiwanese government.

In 2020, Suidani held an independence referendum for Malaita Province, which was dismissed as illegitimate by the central government.

In October 2021, a motion of no confidence was filed against Suidani, but was withdrawn after protests erupted in support of him. He condemned international interference in the November 2021 Solomon Islands unrest. On 7 February 2023, he was removed from office after a vote of no confidence from the provincial legislature.

References 

Living people
Year of birth missing (living people)
Premiers of Malaita Province
Solomon Islands politicians
21st-century politicians
People from Malaita Province